The music of Kerala has a long and rich history. It is not the same as Malayalam poetry, although most of it is poetry driven. Kerala has a rich tradition in Carnatic music. Songs formed a major part of early Malayalam literature, which traces its origin to the 9th century CE. The significance of music in the culture of Kerala can be established just by the fact that in Malayalam language, musical poetry was developed long before prose. With the development of music in the region, different branches were formed out of it.

History

The earliest written record of Malayalam is the Edakal - 5 inscription (ca. 4th Century CE). The early literature of Malayalam comprised three types of composition:
Classical songs known as Naadan Paattu
Manipravalam of the Sanskrit tradition, which permitted a generous interspersing of Sanskrit with Tamil
The folk song rich in native elements
Malayalam poetry to the late 20th century CE It is very unuseful data. varying degrees of the fusion of the three different strands. The oldest examples of Pattu and, are Ramacharitam and Vaishikatantram, both of the twelfth century.

Classical music

Kerala is musically known for Sopana Sangeetham. Sopana Sangeetham is a form of classical music that originated in the temples of Kerala. Sopanam is religious in nature, and developed through singing invocatory songs at the Kalam of Kali, and later inside temples. Sopanam came to prominence in the wake of the increasing popularity of Jayadeva's Gita Govinda or Ashtapadis. Sopana sangeetham (music), as the very name suggests, is sung by the side of the holy steps (sopanam) leading to the sanctum sanctorum of a shrine. It is sung, typically employing plain notes, to the accompaniment of the small, hourglass-shaped ethnic drum called idakka, besides the chengila or the handy metallic gong to sound the beats. Sopanam is traditionally sung by men of the Marar and Pothuval community, who are Ambalavasi (semi-Brahmin) castes engaged to do it as their hereditary profession. Some famous sopanam singers are Neralattu Rama Poduval, Janardhanan Nedungadi and Damodara Marar.

Kerala is also home of Carnatic music. Legends like Swati Tirunal, Irayimman Thampi, Shadkala Govinda Marar, Chembai Vaidyanatha Bhagavatar, V. Dakshinamoorthy, K. J. Yesudas, K.G Jayan (Jayavijaya), Palghat Mani Iyer, Vidwan Gopala Pillai, Chertala Gopalan Nair, M. D. Ramanathan, T. V. Gopalakrishnan, M. K. Sankaran Namboothiri, Mavelikara Krishnankutty Nair,Neyyattinkara Mohanachandran, Neyyattinkara Vasudevan, T. N. Krishnan, T S Nandakumar are renowned musical exponents from Kerala. Among the younger generation, child prodigy violin wizard L.Athira Krishna and Carnatic vocalist P. Unnikrishnan have made their musical impact in the international arena, thus keeping the regal tradition of Carnatic music alive.

Kerala also has a significant presence of Hindustani music as well. The king of Travancore, Swathi Thirunal patronaged and contributed much to the Hindustani Music.

Popular music
Popular music of Kerala had a linear development along with classical music of the region, till the branches separated. The popular music in Kerala is enriched by its highly developed film music branch. Other forms of popular music include light music, pop music and devotional songs.

Kathakali Music

The language of the songs used for Kathakali is Manipravalam, a mixture of Malayalam and Sanskrit. Even though most of the songs are set in ragas based on the microtone-heavy Carnatic music, there is a distinct style of plain-note rendition, which is known as the Sopanam style. This typically Kerala style of rendition takes its roots from the temple songs which used to be sung (continues even now at several temples) at the time when Kathakali was born. The foremost artist was Kalamandalam Krishnan Nair. Kalamandalam at Vallathol Nagar, near Shornur, Trissur in Kerala is an important training center for this art. Since Kathakali is essentially a temple art one of the greatest ever Kathakali singer, Hyderali, who was a Muslim, had to face stiff resistance which eventually was swept away by the immense force of popularity. But Hyderali softened the original Asura nature of the art. Kalamandalam Gangadharan, who remains the last exponent of the original tradition has almost retired from the scene.

Malayalam film music

Film music, which refers to playback singing in the context of Indian music, forms the most important canon of popular music in India. The film music of Kerala in particular is the most popular form of music in the state. Before Malayalam cinema and Malayalam film music developed, the Keralites eagerly followed Tamil and Hindi film songs, and that habit has stayed with them till now. The history of Malayalam film songs begins with the 1948 film Nirmala which was produced by Artist P.J. Cherian who introduced play-back singing for the first time in the film. The film's music composer was P. S. Divakar, and the songs were sung by P. Leela, T. K. Govinda Rao, Vasudeva Kurup, C. K. Raghavan, Sarojini Menon and Vimala B. Varma, who is credited as the first playback singer of Malayalam cinema.

The main trend in the early years was to use the tune of hit Hindi or Tamil songs in Malayalam songs. This trend changed in the early 1950s with the arrival of a number of poets and musicians to the Malayalam music scene. But by the mid of 1950s, Malayalam Film Music Industry started finding its own identity and this reformation was led by the music directors Brother Laxmanan, G. Devarajan, V. Dakshinamurthy, M.S. Babu Raj and K. Raghavan along with the lyricists Vayalar Rama Varma, P. Bhaskaran, O. N. V. Kurup and Sreekumaran Thampi. Major playback singers of that time were Kamukara Purushothaman, K. P. Udayabhanu, A. M. Raja, P. Leela, Santha P. Nair, P. Susheela, P. Madhuri and S. Janaki.  Despite that, these singers got high popularity throughout Kerala and were part of the Golden age of Malayalam music (1960 to 1970). In the later years many non-Malayalis like Manna Dey, Talat Mahmood, Lata Mangeshkar, Asha Bhosle, Hemalata and S. P. Balasubrahmanyam sang for Malayalam films. This trend was also found among composers to an extent, with film composers from other languages including Naushad Ali, Usha Khanna, M. B. Sreenivasan, Bombay Ravi, Shyam, Bappi Lahiri, Laxmikant–Pyarelal, Salil Chowdhury, Ilaiyaraaja, Vishal Bhardwaj and A. R. Rahman scoring music for Malayalam films. This can be attributed to the fact that film music in South India had a parallel growth pattern with so many instances of cross-industry contributions.. The late 1950s through mid 1970s can be considered as the golden period of Malayalam film music in its own identity. Along with the leading music directors, likes of M. B. Sreenivasan, M. K. Arjunan, Pukezhenty Vellappan Nair, M. S. Viswanathan, A. T. Ummer, R. K. Shekhar, Salil Choudhury and lyricists like Thirunainar Kurichi Madhavan Nair, Mankombu Gopalakrishnan and Bharanikkavu Sivakumar, numerous everlasting and super hit songs were delivered to the music lovers. The soft melodious music and high quality lyrics were the highlights of these songs.

K. J. Yesudas, who debuted in 1961, and P. Jayachandran virtually revolutionised the Malayalam film music industry and became the most popular Malayalam singer ever along with K.S. Chitra. Vayalar, G. Devarajan and Yesudas trio also made unforgettable songs like the earlier trio of Kamukara, Tirunainaarkurichy & Brother Laxmanan. Yesudas became equally popular with classical music audience and people who patronised film music. He along with P. Jayachandran gave a major facelift to Malayalam playback singing in the 1960s and 1970s. K. S. Chithra, who debuted in 1979.By the mid-eighties, she became the most sought after female singer in South India.

By Late 1970s, the trends in music started changing and more rhythm oriented songs with western touch came with the dominance of music directors like Shyam, K. J. Joy, Jerry Amaldev etc. The lyricists were forced to write lyrics according to the tune in these days and were often criticized for quality issues. But from 1979 to 1980, the revolutionary music director Raveendran along with Johnson and M. G. Radhakrishnan lead the second reformation of Malayalam film music by creating melodious and classical oriented music with the soul of culture of Kerala. Lyricists like Poovachal Khader, Kavalam Narayana Panicker and Bichu Thirumala in 1980s and Kaithapram Damodaran Namboothiri, Gireesh Puthenchery in 1990s were part of this musical success.  Contributions from Kannur Rajan, Bombay Ravi, S. P. Venkatesh, Mohan Sithara, Ouseppachan, Sharath, Vidyadharan, Raghukumar and Vidyasagar were also notable in this period. Along with K. J. Yesudas and K. S. Chitra and singers like M. G. Sreekumar, G. Venugopal Unnimenon and Sujatha Mohan were also active then. A notable aspect in the later years was the extensive of classical carnatic music in many film songs of the 1980s and 1990s, classical carnatic music was heavily used in films like Chithram (1988), His Highness Abdullah (1990), Bharatham (1991), Sargam (1992) and Sopanam (1993).

At present, the major players in the scene are composers like M. Jayachandran, Bijibal, Rex Vijayan, Rahul Raj, Prashant Pillai, Shaan Rahman, Sushin Shyam, Jakes Bejoy, Gopi Sundar, Alphonse, Rajesh Murugesan, lyricists Rafeeq Ahmed, Anwar Ali, B. K. Harinarayanan, Vinayak Sasikumar, Vayalar Sarath, and singers Vineeth Sreenivasan, Vijay Yesudas, Shweta Mohan, Manjari and Jyotsna Radhakrishnan, along with many other in the field.

The National Award-winning music composers of Malayalam cinema are Johnson (1994, 1995), Bombay Ravi (1995), Ouseppachan (2008), Ilaiyaraaja (2010), Issac Thomas Kottukapally (2011), Bijibal (2012) and M. Jayachandran (2015). Till 2009, the 1995 National Award that Johnson received for the film score of Sukrutham (1994) was the only instance in the history of the award in which the awardee composed the film soundtrack rather than its songs. He shared that award with Bombay Ravi, who received the award for composing songs for the same film. In 2010 and 2011, awards were given to film score and both were won by Malayalam films: Pazhassi Raja (2010; Score: Ilaiyaraaja) and Adaminte Makan Abu (2011; Score: Issak Thomas Kottakapally). Ravindran also received a Special Jury Award in 1992 for composing songs for the film Bharatham. The lyricists who have won the National Award are Vayalar Ramavarma (1973), O. N. V. Kurup (1989) and Yusuf Ali Kechery (2001). The male singers who have received the National Award are K. J. Yesudas (1972, 1973, 1987, 1991, 1993, 2017), P. Jayachandran (1986) and M. G. Sreekumar (1991, 2000). Yesudas has won two more National Awards for singing in Hindi (1977) and Telugu (1983) films, which makes him the person who has won the most National Film Awards for Best Male Playback Singer with seven awards. The female singers who have won the award are S. Janaki (1981) and K. S. Chithra (1987, 1989). Chitra had also won the award for Tamil (1986, 1997, 2005) and Hindi (1998) film songs, which makes her the person with the most National Film Awards for Best Female Playback Singer with six awards.

Mappila Pattu

The Malabar region of the state, with a large Muslim population had developed a signature music stream based on the Hindustani style. The stream consists of a variety of forms like gazals and mappila pattu, and also music for authentic Muslim dance forms such as oppana and kol kali. The poetry forms a main part of this stream of music, which is primarily in Malayalam with the use of Arabic words in between which is known as arabimalayalam. Mappila songs have a charm of their own as their tunes sound a mix of the ethos and culture of Kerala as well as West Asia. They deal with diverse themes such as religion, love, satire and heroism.

Knanaya Folk Songs

The Knanaya, an ethnic group found among the St. Thomas Christians, maintain folk songs that are ancient in origins and were first written down in the year 1910 by the Knanaya scholar P.U Luke in his text Puratana Pattukal or Ancient Songs. The origins of the songs themselves are unknown but were collected by Luke from Knanaya families who kept palm leaf relics which contained the text of these songs. The songs were written in Old Malayalam but contain diction from Sanskrit, Syriac, and Tamil indicating their antiquity. Analytically, these ancient songs contain folklore about the faith, customs and practices of the community, narratives of historical events (such as the mission of St. Thomas the Apostle and the immigration of the Knanaya to India), biblical stories, songs of churches, and the lives of saints. The songs are poetic in nature and are considered treasures in Kerala's cultural heritage. Scholars have also found that the songs of the Knanaya are of a similar composure, linguistics, and characteristic to that of the Cochin Jews and that some songs even have almost the same lyrics with the exception of a few words or stanzas.

Ottamthullal Songs

Ottamthullal songs are meant for the performance of the artform called Ottamthullal. The Ottamthullal artist has to sing and dance to his music. Unlike in the case of Kathakali, the language is not heavy sanskritized Malayalam and the lyrics are set to rhythms that range from simple to rare and complicated.ottamthullal was usually played in temples.

Malayalam Pop music
Pop music in Kerala, developed in the later half of the 1990s with the entry of East Coast Vijayan and his music company East Coast Audios. East Coast Vijayan can be regarded as the pioneer of non-film pop album songs in Kerala. Being a poet himself, Vijayan penned down the first non-film music album in Malayalam Ninakkai, which was released in 1998. The music was given by Balabhaskar and the song "Ninakkay Thozhi Punarjanikkam" sung by Biju Narayanan became a big hit. In 1999, Vijayan came up with his second album in 'Ninakkai' series named Aadhyamai, composed by Balabhaskar and penned by Vijayan himself. The song "Iniyarkkum Arodum" sung by K. J. Yesudas became another hit. In 2001, East Coast came up with Ormakkai which is widely regarded as the biggest hit in the history of Malayalam Pop Music. The song "Ormakkai Iniyoru Snehageetham" from the album, composed by M. Jayachandran, penned down by Vijayan and sung by K. J. Yesudas and K. S. Chithra is widely regarded as an all-time classic hit.

Meanwhile, Pop albums had caught up the imagination of college campuses and more talents started to come up with music albums. One of such early albums that had become a rage with the youth of that time was Valentine's Day. The song "Niranja Mizhiyum" from the album composed by Isaac Thomas Kottukappally and penned down by Gireesh Puthanchery had become a big hit in college campuses. Audio companies other than East Coast started to come up with Music Albums. Front runners among them were Johny Sagarika, Satyam Audios, Magnum audios and Octave audios. As a result, Pop music culture grew in Kerala. In 2006, Satyam audios came up with superhit album Chempakame which saw the rise of a new singing sensation Franco and a talented composer Shyam Dharman. The songs "Sundariye Vaa" and "Chembakame" were record breaking hits. The Same year Shaan rahman with Siju Sivan and Deepu Skaria formed a new band named 'DESINOISE' which launched the album 'Revolution'. The songs "Aasha nirashaa" and "Oo NIlaave" of the album was noted widely for its music and the variety in picturization. In 2008, Johny Sagarika came up with the album Mohamand the song "Kudajadriyil" sung by Swarnalatha and composed by Mansoor Ahmed became a big hit. Meanwhile, Malayali pop saw a new trend that was the rise of boy bands.

One of the first notable boy band was Confusion of Balabhaskar and Ishaan Dev their song "No Tension Please" was a hit. Year 2007 saw the coming of a new band Team Malayalee which rocked the Malayalam album industry. Team Malayalee consisted of four talented musicians Vineeth Sreenivasan, Jakes Bijoy, Shaan Rahman and Arjun Sasi. The songs "Friends 4 ever" and "Minnalazhake" from the album Malayalee was big hit. In 2008, Vineeth Sreenivasan and Shaan Rahman again teamed up to bring out an album Coffee @ MG Road which became another smashing hit. The song "Palavattom" which featured Malayalam actor Salim Kumar is widely regarded as an all-time hit. Year 2009 saw the rise of another boy band YUVA which created waves with debut album Dreamzzz. YUVA consisted for three talented young musicians Vineeth Mohandas, Santhosh Kumar and Sinu Zachariah and they brought some fresh air of good melodies to the Malayalam music industry at a time when the industry was stuck up imitating Tamil, Hindi and Western songs. Their debut video song "Ravin Nilakayalil" was a huge hit and was a chart topper throughout the year 2009. In 2010 they came up with their second music video "Povukayano" sung by Vidhu Pratap which again was popular among youths. In 2010, another boy band named Arrows was formed which included reality music show Asianet's Idea Star Singer sensations Arun Gopan, Roshan N.C., William Isaac and Sudarshan Achary. After a gap of 6 years, East Coast came up with their 6th album in Ninakkai series, a very ambitious project Ennennum. The album was released in 5 languages in India with 60 songs involving 30 leading singers in the country. This magnum opus album was composed by Vijay Karun and penned down by East Coast Vijayan. It can be regarded as the first big budget music album of Kerala. Talented young composers like Rashee (Alone, Loved and Lost), Dijo Jose Antony (La Cochin), Nithin (Autograph), Mithun Raj (Violet)have also created their marks in the Malayalam album industry. In 2012, global music label Sony Music Entertainment entered Malayalam music industry with the album Yuvvh launching musicians Saachin and Sreejith. The album's first song Nenjodu Cherthu crossed 150,000 views on YouTube within 3 days of its release, making it the first major Malayalam viral hit without negative publicity. The last two decades witnessed a true and revolutionary comeback. Through Thaikudam Bridge and Praseetha, this movement based on folk traditions is reaching a visible form. The folk revival movement started seriously by Kavalam Narayana Panicker was practically developed by Kalabhavan Mani but the real support from teenagers came up quite lately.

Pulluvan Pattu

The pulluvar of Kerala are closely connected to the serpent worship. One group among these people consider the snake gods as their presiding deity and perform certain sacrifices and sing songs. This is called Pulluvan Pattu. This is performed in the houses of the lower castes as well as those of the higher castes, in addition to serpent temples.

The song conducted by the pulluvar in serpent temples and snake groves is called Sarppapaattu, Naagam Paattu, Sarpam Thullal, Sarppolsavam, Paambum Thullal or Paambum Kalam. The main aspects of this are Kalamezhuthu (Drawing of Kalam, a ritual art by itself), song and dance.

Temple Music
In Kerala, several forms of music have grown associated with festivals and ceremonies of temples. There are Panchari melam and Pandi melam, two major ensemble performances using chenda and accompanied by ilathalam (cymbals), kuzhal and kombu. Then there is Thayambaka - a form in which one or a few chenda players perform improvised solos with a few more chenda and ilathalam players. Along with these there are kshetra vadyam and sopanam which are music accompanying rituals. There is also Panchavadyam, an orchestra of five instruments - maddalam, thimila, kombu, ilathalam and idakka.

References